The following is the timeline of events of CPP-NPA-NDF rebellion, a conflict between the government of the Philippines, the Communist Party of the Philippines (CPP), the New People's Army (NPA) and the National Democratic Front (NDF).

1970s

1971

 21 August 1971 – Two hand grenades explode during an election campaign rally of the Liberal Party attended by about 4,000 people at Plaza Miranda in the district of Quiapo, Manila, causing nine deaths and injuring 95 others. Among those killed instantly were a 5-year-old child and The Manila Times photographer Ben Roxas, and many on stage were injured, including incumbent Senator Jovito Salonga, Liberal Party president Gerardo Roxas and Sergio Osmeña, Jr., son of former President of the Commonwealth of the Philippines, Sergio Osmeña. The government of President Ferdinand Marcos accuses the communists of staging the attack and suspends the writ of habeas corpus.

1972 
 4 July - The MV Karagatan, which was supposed to bring armaments supplied by China to the NPA reaches Digoyo Point in Palanan, Isabela. However the ship is discovered by a military patrol and is abandoned as it runs aground.
 18 July - A government raid on an NPA hideout in Cordon, Isabela leads to the discovery of the so-called Taringsing Documents, outlining plans by the CPP-NPA to overthrow the government by 1973.
 21 September - President Ferdinand Marcos signs Proclamation No. 1081 placing the entire Philippines under Martial Law, citing the communist rebellion and related incidents.  However, its implementation is delayed for 2 days.
22 September - Defense Secretary Juan Ponce Enrile escapes an alleged ambush blamed on the NPA in San Juan, Metro Manila, providing the Marcos regime with an excuse to implement Martial Law 
23 September - Martial Law is finally announced on television by President Marcos hours after series of mass arrests of against dissidents, including communist supporters. Thousands are detained and several are killed or forcibly disappeared in the ensuing crackdown which lasts for 14 years. Others go into hiding or exile or take up arms by joining the NPA in the provinces
late September to December - The military launches its first major operation against the NPA's primary stronghold in the Sierra Madre mountains in San Mariano, Isabela, forcing the CPP leadership to disperse nationwide but fails in its objective to eliminate the rebellion in Isabela.

1976
 27 August 1976 – President Ferdinand Marcos announced the capture of top NPA commander Victor Corpus. The announcement followed the previous week's arrest of NPA's second in command Bernabe Buscayno and 23 NPA officers. Marcos described the arrests as the final blow to the insurgency.
 13 November 1976 – NPA rebels attacked a logging truck in Mambusao, Davao Oriental. Six security troops were killed and three were wounded.
 22 November 1976 – NPA rebels staged a raid on 5 barrios situated on the perimeter of the Clark Air Base, seizing 43 weapons from the local CHDF militia.

1977
 27–29 August 1977 – Communist guerrillas conducted two ambushes on units of the Philippine Constabulary (PC) in  Pampanga and Subic, Zambales. Six PC members were killed and four wounded.
 10 November 1977 - CPP chairman Jose Maria Sison is arrested at a roadside checkpoint in San Fernando, La Union. Effective control of the NPA is passed on to commander Rodolfo Salas.

1980s

1981
 19 April 1981 – Seventeen people were killed in a grenade attack on San Pedro cathedral, Davao City, during mass. Two grenades were thrown into the congregation as the traditional Easter service was concluding. New People's Army rebels were among several groups suspected of blame, and two young Marxists were apprehended for the attack.

1983
 29 November 1983 – A band of 70 NPA rebels conducted a large scale ambush on Godod between Zamboanga del Norte and Zamboanga del Sur. At least 46 soldiers were killed, including the commander of the 30th Battalion of the 4th Infantry Division.

1985
 6 October 1985 – At least 14 insurgents were slain in an encounter with a military patrol in Polanco, Zamboanga del Norte.

1986
 5 March 1986 - The new government of President Corazon Aquino releases CPP chairman Jose Maria Sison, NPA commander Bernabe Buscayno and 2 other communist leaders as part of her efforts to launch peace negotiations with the CPP-NPA.
 13 September 1986 - The CPLA made a "sipat" or ceasefire with the Philippine government at the Mt. Data Hotel, in Bauko, Mountain Province. The agreement between the two sides was called the 1986 Mount Data Peace Accord.
 30 September 1986 – Authorities arrest NPA chairman Rodolfo Salas along with his wife and driver outside a Manila hospital amid peace talks between the rebels and the government.
 10 December 1986 – A 60-day cease fire is enacted between the NPA and the Philippine government.

1987
 22 January 1987 – 13 demonstrating farmers are killed by security forces in Mendiola Street, Manila. This leads to the breakdown of peace talks between the government and the CPP-NPA-NDF and the resumption of military offensives against the rebels.

1988
 30 March 1988 – A police raid leads to the arrest of NPA chief commander Romulo Kintanar, general secretary Rafael Baylosis and central committee member Benjamin de Vera at a rebel safe house in southern Manila.

1989
 21 April 1989 – Communist guerrillas assassinate U.S. military adviser James N. Rowe in Quezon City and injure his driver.
 26 September 1989 – Two United States Department of Defense contractors are killed outside the Clark Air Base by leftist rebels.

1990s

1992
 The CPP leadership under Jose Maria Sison launches the Second Great Rectification Movement promoting a hardline response to the collapse of communism in eastern Europe and the dissolution of the Soviet Union. This creates a serious split between its supporters, known as the Reaffirmationists (RAs) and relatively moderate critics, known as the Rejectionists (RJs) that lead to the expulsion and assassination of several members and the establishment of rival political and armed groups throughout the decade. 
 15 February 1992 – 47 government soldiers are killed when the NPA ambushes a military convoy in Marihatag, Surigao del Sur
 24 September 1992 – President Fidel V. Ramos signs into law Republic Act 7636, which repealed the Anti-Subversion Law of 1957 that outlawed membership in the Communist Party as part of his efforts to open peace negotiations with the CPP-NPA.

1998
 16 March 1998 – The Comprehensive Agreement on Respect for Human Rights and International Humanitarian Law (CARHRIHL) is signed by the government and the NDFP in The Hague, Netherlands. It calls on both the government and the CPP-NPA-NDFP to adhere to international humanitarian law and provided set mechanisms to oversee the process.

2000s

2000
 From January 15 to February 5, 2000, skeletal remains of at least a hundred individuals, mostly NPA rebels, were exhumed by government authorities from various mass graves in Brgy. Taglimao, Cagayan de Oro. They were believed to be victims of a purge by the NPA in the mid-1980s, known as Operation Zombie. Military authorities estimated that more than 4,000 people were killed, in which only 15 were actually "deep penetration agents" (DPAs), the main target. Since 1999, the remains of at least 416 of them had been recovered in the NPA "killing fields" in the said village. Some former NPA guerillas confessed that the mass killings, particularly of at least 60 rebels in 1986, were allegedly carried out on orders of CPP founding chairman Jose Maria Sison.
 February 5, 2000 – Suspected communists assassinated a village chief and two civilians in Naga, then part of Zamboanga del Sur.
 March 2, 2000 – About 40 NPA rebels attacked an army detachment in Balilihan, Bohol but immediately withdrew. They later ambushed a truckload of soldiers and militiamen, who had sent to reinforce the detachment, along the way in Catigbian, killing at least 5 soldiers and their officer, as well as 4 militiamen.
 March 11, 2000 – The 43rd Infantry Battalion of the Philippine Army captured a NPA camp in Bontoc, Southern Leyte; 5 rebels were killed in a firefight.
 May 9, 2000 – Combined forces of the Army's 1st Infantry Battalion's Task Force Banahaw and the regional police mobile group encountered a band of about 50 NPA fighters in Paete, Laguna; 8 suspected communist rebels were killed.
 June 15, 2000 – Seven soldiers and a militiaman were killed in an ambush by the NPA in Maslog, Eastern Samar.
 June 28, 2000 – NPA insurgents ambushed a military medical mission in Jones, Isabela, killing an Army colonel and 12 of his troops in their worst attack within a decade.
 By July 2000, government forces discovered a mass grave in Baybay, Leyte containing the skeletal remains of more than 10 suspected victims of a rebel purge in the early 1980s.
 July 3, 2000 – A NPA commander identified as Ka Alpha was killed, and three policemen and a civilian were wounded, in a clash in Mansalay, Oriental Mindoro.
 July 4, 2000 – 60 suspected NPA rebels ambushed the police team, who had tasked to investigate the killing of a barangay chairman a day prior, in a mountain village in Victoria, Oriental Mindoro, killing 8 of them and wounding five others.
 September 30, 2000 – A military group, returning from a three-day civic action, was ambushed by the NPA in Paquibato District, Davao City; at least 4 from the group were killed, as well as 5 civilians.
 November 18, 2000 – About 80 NPA rebels attacked a police station in Caramoan, Camarines Sur, later repelled by the policemen; at least 6 NPA guerrillas, a policeman, and a militiaman, were killed.
 December 3, 2000 – A police chief of Puerto Galera, Oriental Mindoro was assassinated by four unidentified men, believed to be NPA rebels. It was said that it was in retaliation to the death of a certain Ka Joel, leader of a three-man NPA group assigned the town, in an encounter in August.

2001
 November 17 – NPA rebels ambushed 25 soldiers of an Army Special Forces platoon on board a dump truck that had hit a landmine in Cateel, Davao Oriental, killing 18 of them; the remaining soldiers returned fire in the ensuing firefight that killed 10 rebels.

2002
 On 30 June 2002, one soldier and 15 militants were injured in the aftermath of a skirmish in Nueva Era, Ilocos Norte. Documentation and pamphlets were seized from rebel-built bunkers.

2003
 On 19 April 2003, 5 soldiers were killed and 9 wounded in the outcome of a gun fight with NPA rebels, outside Ligao, Albay.

2005
 On 13 July 2005, NPA cadres killed nine soldiers and injured three in Ilocos Sur.
 On 29 September 2005, left-wing party Bayan Muna, accused by security forces of being an NPA front, announced that 53 of its members had been killed by alleged government hired gunmen between 2001 and 2005. Leftist labor movement Kilusan Mayo Uno seconded the accusations, claiming that 33 of its activists were killed in 2005. Satur Ocampo described the killings as "political repression masquerading as counter-insurgency and antiterrorism operations". A PNP official said that the killings would be fully investigated, and following an official enquiry, at least two soldiers were charged with murder.
 On 28 October 2005, at least 10 militants were wounded in the aftermath of clashes in Surigao del Sur.
 On 10 November 2005, rebels set light to a public bus in Bataan, after the owner refused to pay a revolutionary tax.

2006
 On 16 July 2006, a Philippine soldier and a policeman were killed in a gunfight in Occidental Mindoro. On the same day, the NPA allegedly assassinated an army officer in Bulacan.
 On 21 July 2006, NPA raided a police station in Isabela, stealing four rifles and a number of communication sets.
 On 23 June 2006, a rebel ambush in Laguna resulted in the injury of a soldier.
 On 24 July 2006, the NPA detonated two landmines along a road situated outside Unidos village, Surigao del Sur, seriously injuring 15 civilians. An NPA spokesman apologized for the incident and offered to cover the costs of the victims' hospital stay, while at the same time stating that NPA would continue the use of IEDs. On the same day, suspected NPA members set fire to a Globe telecommunications tower in Camarines Sur.
 On 26 June 2006, an NPA-planted landmine hit a military minivan in Camarines Sur, wounding a soldier.
 On 8 August 2006, an NPA attack caused the injury of five soldiers who were at the time packing relief supplies for evacuees from the Mayon Volcano area. In a separate incident, the AFP killed five rebels and lost one soldier during clashes with the NPA.

2007
 In May 2007, the NPA imposed a countrywide campaign tax on politicians willing to participate in the 2007 midterm elections. According to a PNP source, the victorious candidate of the Albay governor's race paid the NPA a total of $800,000. Former governor Fernando Gonzales accused the NPA of denying him entry into the southern regions of the province. The rebels also intensified their attacks before the election, resulting in the deaths of 18 people.
 May 28 – Eight soldiers were wounded as NPA rebels ambushed a military convoy in Aurora.
 On 7 June 2007, the NPA engaged AFP troops in Monkayo, Compostela Valley. Both sides issued conflicting reports concerning incident: a government spokesman announced the death of nine rebels and four soldiers, while the NPA denied claimed to have killed 15 soldiers and suffering one fatality.
 On 15 June 2007, the AFP clashed with insurgents in Compostela Valley . Nine militants and four soldiers were killed during the battle.
 On 16 June 2007, NPA fighters killed four policemen in Catanduanes. Weapons were removed from the killed officers.
 On 17 June 2007, a squad of militants detonated three bombs at a Globe Telecom tower in Iloilo after disarming the security guards on the site.
 On 24 June 2007, several dozen communist guerrillas carried out a raid on the town hall of Dangcagan, Bukidnon. One police officer was killed as the rebels fled with eight stolen weapons.
 On 29 June 2007, a band of militants launched an offensive on an AFP patrol base in Agusan del Norte. Eight militants and seven AFP soldiers were killed, and the rebels abducted three AFP personnel.
 On 31 June 2007, three guerrillas were killed by the Philippine Army in Agusan del Norte.

2008
 On 5 May 2008, the NPA assassinated former Legazpi City chief Narciso Guarin.
 On 26 October 2008, NPA fighters masquerading as Philippine Drug Enforcement Agency officer raid the Quezon Provincial Jail to free seven imprisoned NPA fighters. In response to the jailbreak, high-risk NPA fighters were immediately transferred to other secure prisons.

2009
 On 13 November 2009, an NPA attack on a logging site resulted in 23 deaths.

2010s

2010
 On 15 May 2010 at around 14:50, a truck carrying members of the Philippine Army was bombed in Davao City. One soldier died and two injured soldiers were evacuated to Davao Medical Center.
 On 20 May 2010, a team from the Philippine National Police Special Action Force were aboard their vehicle when suspected NPA rebels detonated a land mine at San Jose village in Antipolo, Rizal at around 6 am.
 On 13 July 2010, the NPA executed Mateo Biong, Jr., a drug cartel leader and former mayor of Giporlos, Eastern Samar. Biong was accused of killing rival drug dealers, illegal logging and mining, and misuse of public funds.
 On 26 September 2010, security forces killed top NPA commander Elmer Osila during clashes in the town of Goa, Camarines Sur.
 On 14 December 2010, ten soldiers were killed and two injured in the aftermath of a guerrilla ambush in Las Navas, Northern Samar. The rebels took 11 rifles from the killed soldiers.
 On 15 December 2010, two civilians were killed, one of them a 15-year-old boy and the other a former chairman of Barangay Poponton, in an ambush on a pump boat along Hinaga River in Las Navas, Northern Samar. Five soldiers and a civilian were reported missing as a result of the ambush carried out with automatic weapons at around 5 pm that left the civilian vessel heavily damaged. The attack was believed to have been carried out by an undetermined number of the NPA rebels who were said to be hiding along the forested area of the Hinaga River.

2011
 On 26 May 2011, three construction workers are killed and another wounded in an attack staged by leftist rebels in the ore-rich municipality of Tampakan, South Cotabato. Ten gunmen, believed to be NPA rebels, ambushed a convoy of five trucks at around 1:30pm with small arms and grenades in the village of Danlag.
 On 2 June 2011, the PNP arrested rebel explosive expert Ryan Sison in Dalahican village, Lucena City, Quezon, confiscating IED components.
 On 4 July 2011, a closure agreement between the CPLA and the Government of the Philippines was signed at Rizal Hall in Malacañang Palace. The agreement called for the disarmament of the group, the reintegration of the militants into mainstream society and the conversion of the militant group into a socio-economic organization.
 On 26 July 2011, one government militiaman was killed and one wounded in Barangay Gumitan, Marilog district, Davao City.
 On 3 October 2011, a band of 200 NPA fighters set fire to equipment belonging to mining corporations in the villages of Cagdianao and Taganito, Claver, Surigao del Norte.

2012
 On 16 January 2012, six insurgents were killed during a clash in a Japanese banana plantation in Compostela Valley.
 On 9 April 2012, rebels carried out a raid on the police station of Tigbao, Zamboanga del Sur, stealing weapons and taking hostage a policeman, who was later released.
 On 19 April 2012, an IED detonated by the NPA killed three and injured two soldiers in New Upian, Barangay Marilog, Marilog district, Davao City.
 On 23 April 2012, militants stole several high-powered assault rifles from a security agency in Butuan City, Agusan del Norte, after posing as National Bureau of Investigation agents.
 On 25 April 2012, an NPA attack resulted in the deaths of 11 soldiers and 2 civilians in Ifugao.
 On 29 April 2012, militants killed four soldiers and a civilian PDT member in Labo, Camarines Norte, and took their weapons.
 On 7 May 2012, the NPA claimed to have carried out an ambush in Trento, Agusan del Sur town, and Monkayo, Compostela Valley, killing three soldiers, and wounding four. In a second incident, two soldiers were wounded in the vicinity of the Bahayan river, Trento. The AFP responded by bombing the town of Trento, displacing 80 families.
 On 14 May 2012, a soldier was killed during a shootout in Barangay Bucalan in Canlaon, Negros Oriental.
 On 20 May 2012, rebels sabotaged equipment stationed at an airport construction site in Albay.
 On 24 May 2012, NPA agents assassinated an intelligence officer at the cockfighting pit of Lagonglong, Misamis Oriental.

2013
 January 27 – Twenty suspected NPA guerrillas ambushed a truck, with policemen and village officials among those aboard, in La Castellana, Negros Occidental; nine people, including a policeman and three village officials, were killed.
 On 28 February 2013, authorities detained the NPA's Central Visayas commander Ruben Nabas along with his secretary. On the same day, two NPA members surrendered to the authorities of Barangay Del Pilar, Cabadbaran, Agusan del Norte.
 On 7 May 2013, two soldiers were killed while escorting election officials in Kalinga.
 On 11 May 2013, rebels of the communist New People's Army allegedly ambushed the convoy of Kadingilan, Bukidnon mayor Joelito Jacosalem Talaid, wounding him and killing four of his bodyguards. A radio report stated the mayor had been shot in the leg. Talaid was traveling through Barangay Kibogtok when he and his bodyguards were stopped by up to 10 armed men. Talaid was also allegedly forced to hand over 7 million Philippine pesos worth of cash to the suspects.
 On 20 May 2013, NPA militants raided the office of a security agency in Orange Valley village, Tagum City, Davao del Norte, stealing firearms, ammunition and bulletproof vests. They also detonated an IED on a national highway in Barangay Pandapan, Tagum City, injuring five soldiers and a civilian.
 On 27 May 2013, a group of 30 rebels ambushed a Special Action Force patrol in Capagaran village, Allacapan, Cagayan, killing 8 policemen and injuring 7 others.
 On 21 August 2013, one soldier was killed and three were wounded in a skirmish in Purok, Barangay Balagan in San Mariano, Isabela. Security forces seized two IEDs and propaganda materials.
 On 30 August 2013, Philippine Air Force helicopters bombed rebel positions in the northern area of Sagada, Mountain Province, following a clash that took place a day earlier during which two policemen were wounded.
 On 5 December 2013, NPA officer Rene Rabulan Briones was killed in Del Gallego, Camarines Sur, during a shootout with the Philippine military.
 On 14 December 2013, the NPA raided a police station in Kibawe, Bukidnon. A police officer was killed, and the insurgents stole 13 firearms before escaping in four cars.

2014
 On 1 January 2014, suspected NPA members gunned down Demetrio Capilastique, a leading figure of the Revolutionary Proletarian Army-Alex Boncayao Brigade (RPA-ABB), in Badiangan, Iloilo.
 On 22 March 2014, Communist Party of the Philippines (CPP) Chairman Benito Tiamzon, his wife Wilma Tiamzon (secretary general of the NPA) and five others were arrested in Barangay Zaragosa, Aloguinsan, Cebu. The Tiamzons had a standing warrant of arrest orders for crimes against humanity, including charges of murder, multiple murder and frustrated murder.
 On 27 March 2014, Andrea Rosal, daughter of deceased former NPA spokesman "Ka Roger" Rosal, was arrested in Caloocan.
 Between 7–10 April 2014, NPA set fire to vehicles and heavy equipment belonging to mining companies in Masara village in Maco and Pantukan, Compostela Valley, after alleged environmental damage caused by the mining companies.
 17 April – insurgents clashed with a detachment of the Citizen Armed Force Geographical Unit (CAFGU) in Barangay San Pascual, Catarman, Northern Samar. There were no casualties.
 20 May – five communist militants were killed in two separate encounters in President Roxas, Cotabato and Tayabas, Quezon. One soldier was wounded. Loyalist forces seized weaponry, radios, ammunition and propaganda materials.
 23 May – at least five NPA rebels were killed and two captured in a firefight that took place in Barangay Balocawe, Matnog, Sorsogon.
 8 June – security forces captured NPA commander Nasyo in Tanjay City, Negros Oriental.
 16 July – an NDF spokesman announced that the NPA had suffered 14 fatalities following simultaneous attacks against private armies in Santa Irene, Prosperidad, Barangay Bitan-agan, San Francisco, Agusan del Sur. A civilian and a private army commander were also killed in the incident, and NDF claimed to have seized a number of weapons during the raids.
 31 July – One soldier and an unspecified number of rebels were killed in a firefight in Tapaz, Capiz.
 6 August – The AFP arrested top militant commander Eduardo Almores Esteban in Landheights subdivision in Barangay Buntala, Jaro, Iloilo City.
 4 September – Five NPA fighters died in an encounter with an army patrol in Lacub, Abra.
 3 November – NPA gunmen killed two soldiers in Daraga, Albay .
 5 November – The AFP engaged suspected NPA insurgents, killing three fighters and seizing nine weapons, in Sitio Tubak, Barangay Nomol, Maasim, Sarangani.
 23 November – Three civilians were injured in an NPA attack on an army patrol post in Sitio Guiwanon, Barangay Danao, San Jacinto, Masbate.
 25 November – The PNP detained rebel commander Billy Morado along with another insurgent in Caloocan.
 5 December – a security force patrol clashed with communist guerrillas in Sitio Upper Balantang, Barangay Cabuyuan, Mabini, Compostela Valley, killing five rebels.
 17 December – The Criminal Investigation and Detection Group arrested NPA commander Jordan Reyes Donillo at a checkpoint located in Barangay Magnaga, Pantukan, Compostela Valley. On the same day, the NPA released a statement claiming to have killed 40 government loyalists, including policemen, soldiers and militia, in the course of 28 operations in December.
 26 December – The Philippines government and the local Communist Party agreed to renew talks that may lead to a peace treaty which could end the 46-year insurgency.
 29 December – Three soldiers were killed in a communist ambush in Mabini, Compostela Valley.

2015
 16 January – Three NPA officers surrendered to the authorities in Capiz, the former rebels belonged to the Tugalbong and Baloy platoons of NPA.
 23 January – Government troops clashed with NPA militants in Sitio Brazil, Mat-i, Surigao City and Imbayao, Malaybalay, Bukidnon. Despite the fact that no casualties were reported, the Philippine Army seized two rifles and a grenade launcher in the former encounter.
 28 January – NPA rebels killed a soldier of the 69th Infantry Battalion in an ambush in the Paquibato district, Davao City.
 2 February – Rebels executed Rufino Dumayas, a former NPA commander, after accusing him of revealing the identities of several rebels and cooperating with security forces.
 5 February – An army officer was killed by communist guerrillas in the town of Las Navas, Northern Samar. Two rebels were later arrested.
 6 February – Security forces overpowered a group of NPA rebels, forcing them to flee, in Barangay Rojales, Carmen, Agusan del Norte. Numerous weapons, explosives and communication equipment were seized, and one rebel was arrested.
 8 February – Authorities arrested Raunil Mortejo, Reboy Gandinao and Jasmin Badilla, three members of NPA's Eastern Mindanao Command. The arrests took place in Barangay Sinaragan, Matanao, Davao del Sur, and in Barangay Lumintao in Quezon, Bukidnon.
 9 February – Security forces uncovered NPA encampments in Sitio Tig-atay, Barangay Igpaho, Tubungan, Iloilo, and Sitio Tigmarabas, Barangay Ongyod, Miag-ao, Iloilo. The camps had the capacity to accommodate 120 people.
 14 March – A landmine detonation killed 3 soldiers and wounded five others, the incident occurred in Los Arcos, Prosperidad, Agusan del Sur.
 1 April – Two soldiers and a civilian were slain in an NPA ambush in Sityo Ban-as, Barangay Mahayag, San Miguel, Surigao del Sur, seven people were also wounded.
 2 June – Authorities detained NPA's top commander Adelberto Silva in Bacoor, Cavite south of Manila, grenades and documentation were also recovered during the operation.

2016

2017
 30 January – Two soldiers were killed following an ambush staged by suspected NPA guerrillas in Echague, Isabela.
 8 February – Heavy equipment were set to fire by the rebels in San Francisco, Quezon.
 8 February – A soldier was killed in a firefight in Santo Niño, Cagayan.
 9 February – Rebels burned two trucks in Itogon, Benguet.
 9 February – NPA rebels killed a resident and abducted two others in Talakag, Bukidnon.
 13 February – Four rebels were killed in a firefight with gov't troops in Aroroy, Masbate.
 16 February – Two soldiers and three communist New People's Army rebels were killed while 15 other troops were wounded in a land mine attack and clashes in Davao City. 
 8 March – Rebels ambushed a police convoy, resulting in 4 policemen killed and injuring another. The ambush occurred in Bansalan, Davao del Sur.
 18 March – A rebel was killed in an encounter with gov't troops in Kitcharao, Agusan del Norte.
 30 March – An encounter between the military and rebels took place in General Nakar, Quezon. Two soldiers and 10 rebels were killed in the encounter.
 28 July – Firefight between government forces and communist inTrece Martires village, Casiguran in Sorsogon left 4 communist rebels dead.

2018
 23 January –
 Two soldiers died and two were wounded in an encounter with members of the New People's Army in Pinukpuk, Kalinga.
 A retired policeman was killed by members of the New People's Army in Tabuk, Kalinga.
 25 January – Communist insurgents killed an Army officer and wounded 2 soldiers in a firefight in Paquibato proper, Davao City.
 28 January – A man was kidnapped and later executed by terrorists of the New People's Army in San Miguel, Surigao del Sur.
 15 August – Seven NPA militants were killed during a gunfight that lasted 33 minutes, in San Jose, Antique.
 28 December – The National Task Force to End Local Communist Armed Conflict (NTF-ELCAC) was formed, pursuant to Executive Order No. 70 issued by President Rodrigo Duterte
 30 December – Six militants were killed in Negros Oriental were killed in separate encounters with government forces during the weekend, the Armed Forces of the Philippines (AFP) said and 24 arrested during a series of raids and anti-rebels raids including former Guihulngan Mayor Cesar Macalua, who were allegedly involved in the illegal drug trade.

2019
November 26 – CPP-NPA Leader Jaime "Ka Diego" Padilla was captured and arrested in San Juan, Metro Manila after undergoing an executive checkup in Cardinal Santos Medical Center , Debold Sinas and the officers announced that he carries P4.4 million  of a revolutionary tax he collected.

2020s

2020

2021
January 6 – A military officer of the 72nd Division Reconnaissance Group was killed in a shootout incident with rebels in Abra.
January 12 – Government employee Pio Lingatong was assassinated by militants in Barangay Aloja, Batuan, Bohol.
January 17 – 3 soldiers were killed and 1 were wounded in an ambush in Legazpi City, Albay, the soldiers were transporting intel when they were attacked.
January 20 – Several militants killed 2 kidnapped village officials in Masbate, 1 being a councilman and another being a watchman.
January 22 – 1 soldier was killed in a shootout with rebels in Lamag village, Quirino, Ilocos Sur.
January 28 – Shots were fired at the Sison police station in Surigao del Norte, 2 hours later a group of rebels in the same area ambushed a patrol, a military officer sustained injuries to the head.
January 30 – A skirmish occurred between militiamen and rebels in Don Victoriano Chiongbian, Misamis Occidental, at least 1 militiaman was injured.
February 3 – A soldier was wounded by an IED during a skirmish with rebels in the Umayam tribe region of Bukidnon.
February 4 – Rebels assassinated militiaman Darwin Juagpao in Tandag City, Surigao del Sur.
February 5 – 2 soldiers were killed and 1 wounded during a clash with rebels in Quezon.
February 8 – Rebels assassinated militiaman Lander Sta. Ana Garde in Guihulngan, Negros Oriental.
February 9 – A military lieutenant was killed along with 2 rebels during intense clashes in Quezon.
February 17 – 2 former mayors and 2 others were assassinated during a rebel ambush in Barangay Ignacio B. Jurado, Lasam, Cagayan. NPA propaganda was found near the scene and there were no less than 6 attackers.
February 18 – A soldier was wounded during a skirmish with rebels in San Joaquin, Iloilo.
February 19 – A Special Action Force member with the Philippine National Police was wounded in a shootout with rebels in Northern Samar.
February 22 – 4 Special Action Force troopers and 2 civilians were wounded by a rebel IED on a highway in Barangay Putiao, Pilar, Sorsogon, the rebels also engaged in a brief firefight with the police before retreating.
February 25 – Rebels torched a Dump Truck and a Backhoe in Barangay Binocaran, Malimono, Surigao del Norte. the vehicles belonged to CV Construction.
February 28 – Rebels killed village chief Julie Capin during a drive by in Barangay Roosevelt, Tapaz, Capiz.
March 3 – Rebels detonated a landmine near a police car in Janiuay, Iloilo. Nobody was injured in the explosion.
June 8 – Keith Absalon and his brother Nolven were killed in a Masbate City blast, after 24 NPA rebels detonated landmines and explosives. Later, one rebel was arrested and 23 rebels were declared as wanted by the Philippine National Police.
October 30 – NPA Leader Jorge "Ka Oris" Madlos was slain after the clash with military troops in Impasugong, Bukidnon.

2022
February 24 – alleged communist rebels were killed in Andap village, New Bataan, Davao de Oro by the Armed Forces of the Philippines troops.
 June 8 – An NPA member was killed in an encounter in Palimbang, Sultan Kudarat.
 July 6 – Four communist rebels, had involved in the ambush of policemen in Binalbagan, Negros Occidental in February, were killed in an encounter.
 July 26 – Three suspected NPA rebels died in a gunbattle in Canlaon, Negros Oriental.
 July 30 – Three NPA rebels, including a high-ranking leader, were killed in encounters in Palimbang, Sultan Kudarat.
 August 22 – A boat carrying ten NPA members, reportedly including leaders Benito and Wilma Tiamzon, exploded during an encounter with the military's Joint Task Force Storm off Catbalogan, Samar. Some remains were later retrieved. In December, the National Intelligence Coordinating Agency confirmed the deaths of the Tiamzon couple.
 September 6 – Son and wife of Ka Oris Madlos' Vincent Isagani Madlos and Angie Polandres Salinas were killed after an encounter with members of the 8th Infantry Battalion under the 403rd Infantry Brigade in Barangay Kapitan Bayong, Bukidnon.
 September 23 – An armed confrontation between government troops and communist militants occurred in Esperanza, Sultan Kudarat. Casualties were undetermined.
 October 6–19 – Series of armed encounters between troops of the 94th Infantry Battalion (94IB) of the Philippine Army (PA) and CPP–NPA rebels began on October 6 in Barangay Carabalan, Himamaylan, Negros Occidental. Two soldiers were killed on October 8; Romeo Nanta, commanding officer of the Regional Operational Command of Komiteng Rehiyon-Negros, was also killed on October 10. As a result, more than 3,000 individuals from barangays Carabalan and Cabadiangan were temporarily displaced until Oct. 18. On October 12, the 94IB seized a communist rebels' hideout. On October 19, it was confirmed that encounter sites were cleared by the PA.
 October 7 – Two soldiers were killed in an NPA attack in Jipapad, Eastern Samar.
 October 30 – A top NPA leader was killed in an encounter in Senator Ninoy Aquino, Sultan Kudarat.
 November 23 – Six rebels from the NPA's Eastern Visayas Regional Party Committee, including its leader, were killed in an encounter with Army troopers in Las Navas, Northern Samar.
 November 24
 Six NPA rebels belonging to a sub-regional command, including a ranking leader and his wife, were killed in an encounter with soldiers of the Army's 7th Infantry Battalion in Bagumbayan, Sultan Kudarat.
 Suspected communist rebels shot and killed two soldiers in an ambush in Sipalay, Negros Occidental.
 December 16 – Jose Maria Sison, founding chairperson of the CPP, died after a two-week hospital confinement in Utrecht, Netherlands.

2023
 February 4–5 – Two separate clashes between government forces and NPA rebels occurred in a village in Kabankalan, Negros Occidental. Following the second encounter, the bodies of three dead rebels and their weapons were recovered.
 February 9 – Five communist rebels were killed in a dawn encounter between soldiers of the 2nd Infantry Battalion (IB), who were conducting a security patrol, and some 20 NPA members in Cawayan, Masbate; four more were arrested.
 February 18 – Two alleged NPA rebels were killed in separate military operations in Borongan, Eastern Samar and T'Boli, South Cotabato.
 February 20 – Two soldiers of the 31st IB of the Philippine Army, part of the augmentation force in the search operations for the passengers of a plane crashed on Mayon volcano, were shot dead by three men in Camalig, Albay. The NPA in the province later claimed responsibility for the deaths.
 March 1 – Three separate clashes between the NPA guerrillas and the 94th IB in Himamaylan, Negros Occidental, in one of the sites of similar incidents in 2022, killed four suspected NPA members and injured a soldier.
 March 2 – Three NPA rebels were killed in a military encounter in Senator Ninoy Aquino, Sultan Kudarat.

References

CPP-NPA-NDF rebellion